Yehonatan Berick (August 30, 1968 – October 31, 2020) was a violin and viola virtuoso and pedagogue.
 
Born in Holon, Israel, he started his musical education at the age of six. His principal violin teachers were Ilona Feher, Henry Meyer, Kurt Sassmannshaus, and Dorothy DeLay. He had theory teachings with composer Sergiu Natra, and attended masterclasses with such artists as Isaac Stern, Henryk Szeryng, Max Rostal and Josef Gingold. 
In 1993 he was prizewinner at the Walter W. Naumburg International Violin Competition, and in 1997 he was awarded Quebec's Prix Opus.

Berick has performed as soloist, presented numerous recitals and collaborated in chamber music performances with a long list of internationally renowned artists. He took part in the world's leading festivals, including Marlboro and Ravinia. Touring as a chamber musician, he has been featured in the world's most important music centers. He has recorded for the Summit, Gasparo, Acoma, JMC and Helicon labels. He was Professor of Violin at the School of Music at the University of Ottawa, and has also taught at the University of Michigan at Ann Arbor, McGill University in Montreal and at the Eastman School of Music in Rochester, NY.

Yehonatan Berick died from cancer on October 31, 2020, aged 52.

References 

1968 births
2020 deaths
American classical violinists
Male classical violinists
American male violinists
Israeli classical violinists
American classical violists
Israeli classical violists
University of Michigan faculty
Academic staff of the University of Ottawa
21st-century classical violinists
21st-century American male musicians
21st-century American violinists
21st-century violists